Fojnica can refer to:

 Fojnica, a town in Bosnia
 Fojnica, Gacko, a village in Bosnia
 Fojnička River, a river in Bosnia